The 1926 TCU Horned Frogs football team represented Texas Christian University (TCU) as a member the Southwest Conference (SWC) during the 1926 college football season. Led by fourth-year head coach Matty Bell, the Horned Frogs compiled and overall record of 6–1–2 overall with a mark of 1–1–2 in conference play, tying for third place. TCU played their home games at Clark Field, located on campus in Fort Worth, Texas.

Schedule

References

TCU
TCU Horned Frogs football seasons
TCU Horned Frogs football